The 8th Annual Streamy Awards was the eighth installment of the Streamy Awards honoring the best in American streaming television series and their creators. The ceremony was broadcast live on YouTube on October 22, 2018, from The Beverly Hilton in Beverly Hills, California. They were hosted by The Try Guys.

On October 9, 2018, the 1st annual Streamys Brand Awards were held during the IAB Digital Content NewFronts West at NeueHouse Hollywood and hosted by Alisha Marie and Remi Cruz. The awards honored notable achievements in digital marketing. On October 18, 2018, the 2nd annual Purpose Awards @ The Streamys were held, hosted by Jay Shetty. The awards recognized digital creators, brands, and nonprofits who have used their influence for a greater good.

Performers 
The 8th Annual Streamy Awards featured the following musical performances:

Winners and nominees

 

The nominees were announced on September 25, 2018. 24 of the awards were announced on October 20 at the Streamy Premiere Awards in Santa Monica, hosted by BlameItOnKway and Montana Tucker. The remaining awards were announced at the main ceremony at the Beverly Hilton on October 22. Among the awards presented at the ceremony was the first ever Milk-Bone Dog of the Year Honor, which was voted for by fans and presented by Gus Kenworthy. Winners of the categories were selected by the Streamys Blue Ribbon Panel except for the Audience Choice and Dog of the Year awards which were put to a public vote.

Winners are listed first, in bold.

Brand Awards
The first annual Streamys Brand Awards were presented at a separate event hosted by Alisha Marie and Remi Cruz at NeueHouse Hollywood on October 9, 2018, during the IAB Digital Content NewFronts West. Winners are listed first, in bold.

Purpose Awards

The second annual Purpose Awards were presented at a separate event hosted by Jay Shetty on October 18, 2018. The awards were followed by a Creator Summit which featured panels in which creators discussed mental health and suicide prevention. Purpose Award honorees are listed in bold.

Reception 
Kathryn Lindsay of Refinery29 praised the diversity of nominees for the awards. PinkNews, Pride.com, and Gay Star News highlighted YouTuber Anna Akana's acceptance speech in which she came out as a queer woman. The event had an increased livestream viewership of 73% compared with the previous year.

References

Streamy Awards
Streamy Awards
Streamy Awards
2018 in Internet culture